inoSMI (a derivation from "foreign mass media") is an internet media project that monitors and translates articles published in foreign and Western media into Russian, and is part of the state media group Russia Today.

History 
The service is affiliated with the RIA Novosti news agency and is sponsored by Russia's Federal Agency on Press and Mass Communications (FAPMC).

The project was masterminded and directed by Yaroslav Ognev who has been serving as its editor-in-chief since its foundation. In March 2009, Marina Pustilnik was assigned the editor-in-chief of inoSMI.

While RIA Novosti states that the project website was launched in February 2004, a WHOIS service query indicates that the domain name had been reserved since 2001.

Current chief editor is Alexey Dubosarsky.

Activity

The translations are published online on a daily basis. The range of topics varies: culture, politics, social and other. But most of the translated articles are analytical essays written by Western journalists on topics related to Russia and the former Soviet Union. Regular news articles are rarely published. inoSMI also publishes videos, blogs and the most remarkable issues from the world's leading media forums.

While the service has several professional translators on its payroll, a noticeable fraction of translations is performed by its eager readers on a voluntary basis. Readers also participate in media monitoring, as they may suggest an article for translation.

Since its foundation, the site has a forum where new publications are discussed. The moderation policy is rather loose and allows for a variety of views. Material that can be regarded by editors as promoting competing reader projects will be censored though.

An unusual phenomenon that took off recently on inoSMI forum can be described as a massive voluntary effort in translating into Russian other readers' forums hosted by foreign media.

inoSMI also invites leading foreign journalists and editors to discuss the publications with Russian readers. For instance, Stanislaw Lem's conference with the inosmi.ru readers on 17 January 2006 was the last press conference before his death.

Sanctions 
In February 2023 Canada sanctioned InoSMI for being involved in Russian propaganda and spreading misinformation relating to the 2022 war in Ukraine.

Achievements

inoSMI claims a daily audience of 70,000–90,000 visitors, most of them from Russia.

In 2007, it won the "Culture and Mass Media" category of the Runet Prize, supervised by the FAPMC.

Viewpoint of Ognev

The first editor-in-chief of the resource explained his viewpoint in numerous interviews. In a February 2009 interview to the REGNUM News Agency, he said:

Assignment of Pustilnik

On March 11, 2009 RIA Novosti announced assigning a new editor-in-chief of the resource, Marina Pustilnik. The explanation included:

While prior to the depicted events the resource enjoyed about 700,000 visits and 150,000 visitors a day, those numbers got decreased approximately 1.5 times in few days.

References

Literature 

 How a Kremlin-Linked Influence Operation is Systematically Manipulating Western Media to Construct & Communicate Disinformation, part 1 «DETECTION REPORT», Cardiff University, Whales, England, 2021
 Anneleen Spiessens, Piet Van Poucke. Translating news discourse on the Crimean crisis: patterns of reframing on the Russian website InoSMI, Ghent University, Ghent, Belgium, 2016
 Julie Fedor, Andreas Umland, Andriy Portnov, Fredheim Rolf. Journal of Soviet and Post-Soviet Politics and Society, стр. 37, 47-49, 71. Stuttgart, Germany, 2015

External links 
 

Internet properties established in 2001
News agencies based in Russia
Russian news websites
Russian-language websites
Translation companies
Mass media monitoring
State media